Blacks and Jews is a 1997 documentary film that examines the relationships and conflicts between black and Jewish activists, from the 1991 Crown Heights Riot to Steven Spielberg's controversial visit to the predominantly Black Castlemont High School after some students laughed during a screening of Schindler's List.

The film focused on incidents such as the 1960s blockbusting of the then-largely Jewish Lawndale neighborhood on the West Side of Chicago and a rabbi's efforts to maintain stability in the community and of a Hasidic father and son who were protected by a Black journalist during the 1991 riots in Brooklyn that took place in the wake of the death of Gavin Cato by a Hasidic driver.

Blacks and Jews was directed by Deborah Kaufman and Alan Snitow. The 90-minute film was aired as part of PBS's Point of View series.

The film was shown as part of the 1997 Sundance Film Festival in Park City, Utah.

See also 
 Chabad in film and television
 Fires in the Mirror
 The Secret Relationship Between Blacks and Jews

References

External links 
 
 P.O.V. Blacks and Jews - PBS's site dedicated to the film
 Transcript - full transcript of film

1997 films
African American–Jewish relations
Documentary films about African Americans
Documentary films about Jews and Judaism in the United States
POV (TV series) films
Films about Orthodox and Hasidic Jews
Films about Chabad
1990s English-language films
1990s American films